Abangares River Basin Protected Zone, is a protected area in Costa Rica, managed under the Arenal Tempisque Conservation Area, it was created in 1995 by decree 24539-MIRENEM.

References 

Nature reserves in Costa Rica
Protected areas established in 1995